Cold Spring Harbor Protocols (formerly CSH Protocols) is an on-line scientific journal and methods database for biologists, published by Cold Spring Harbor Laboratory Press. Protocols are presented step-by-step and edited in the style that has made Molecular Cloning, Antibodies, Cells and many other CSH manuals essential to the work of scientists worldwide.  Protocols in the database come from CSH manuals, courses taught at Cold Spring Harbor Laboratory, and newly submitted methods from the scientific community. The journal was launched in June 2006.

See also
Cold Spring Harbor Laboratory Press
Cold Spring Harbor Laboratory
Protocol (natural sciences)

External links
CSH Protocols
CSHL Press Website

Biology journals
Research methods journals
Cold Spring Harbor Laboratory Press academic journals
Publications established in 2006
Monthly journals